This is a list of UNIVAC products. It ends in 1986, the year that Sperry Corporation merged with Burroughs Corporation to form Unisys as a result of a hostile takeover bid launched by Burrough's CEO W. Michael Blumenthal..

The Remington Rand years (1950 to 1955)

Calculating devices 
UNIVAC 60
UNIVAC 120
UNIVAC 121

Computer systems
UNIVAC I
UNIVAC 1101
UNIVAC 1102
UNIVAC 1103
UNIVAC 1104

Peripherals

Storage
 UNISERVO tape drive

Display and print
UNIVAC High speed printer 600 line/min printer

Offline tape handling units
UNIPRINTER 10 char/s printer with tape drive
UNITYPER keyboard with tape drive
UNIVAC Tape to Card converter card punch with tape drive
UNIVAC Card to Tape converter card reader with tape drive
UNIVAC Paper Tape to Tape converter paper tape reader with tape drive

The Sperry Rand years (1955 to 1978)

Calculating devices
UNIVAC 1004
UNIVAC 1005

Computer systems

Embedded systems
AN/USQ-17 – the Naval Tactical Data System (NTDS) or M-460
AN/USQ-20 – updated NTDS, aka UNIVAC 1206 or G-40
AN/UYK-5 16-bit digital CPU Military System (Navy/Marines) used for logistics/pay/maintenance management (Navy Shipboard, Marines Portable)
AN/UYK-7 – multiprocessor for Aegis. 32-bit replacement for the Naval Tactical Data System, derived from UNIVAC 1108
AN/UYK-8 – dual processor version of the Naval Tactical Data System
AN/UYK-20
AN/UYK-43 – replaced and shared its instruction set with the AN/UYK-7
AN/UYK-44 – replaced and shared its instruction set with the AN/UYK-20
UNIVAC 1218 – real-time computer
UNIVAC 1230 – later, faster (2×) version of the AN/USQ-20 (memory size and I/O were identical)

Word machines
LARC
UNIVAC Solid State
UNIVAC II
UNIVAC III
UNIVAC 418 – real-time computer
UNIVAC 418-II – real-time computer
UNIVAC 418-III – real-time computer
UNIVAC 422 - Univac Digital Trainer, part of the Programmed Educational Package (Prep)
UNIVAC 490 – commercial adaptation of AN/USQ real-time system
UNIVAC 492
UNIVAC 494
UNIVAC 494-MAPS – The first Multi-Associated Processor System - not made available commercially
UNIVAC 1103A
UNIVAC 1104
UNIVAC 1105
UNIVAC 1100/2200 series:
UNIVAC 1106 (half-speed 1108)
UNIVAC 1107
UNIVAC 1108
UNIVAC 1110
UNIVAC 1100/10 (1106 upgraded with semiconductor memory)
UNIVAC 1100/20 (1108 upgraded with semiconductor memory)
UNIVAC 1100/40 (1110 upgraded with semiconductor memory)
UNIVAC 1100/82A
UNIVAC 1100/181

Variable word length machines
UNIVAC 1050

Byte machines
These machines implemented a variant of the IBM System/360 architecture
UNIVAC 9000 series
UNIVAC 9200
UNIVAC 9300
UNIVAC 9400
UNIVAC 9480

Peripherals

Storage
FH-432 (Flying Head) drum
FH-880 (Flying Head) drum
FH-1782 (Flying Head) drum
FASTRAND drum drive
RANDEX drum drive
UNISERVO I tape drive
UNISERVO II tape drive
UNISERVO IIA tape drive
UNISERVO III tape drive
UNISERVO IIIC tape drive
UNISERVO VI-C tape drive
UNISERVO VIII-C tape drive
UNISERVO 12 tape drive (1600 BPI)
UNISERVO 16 tape drive (1600 BPI)
UNISERVO 20 tape drive (1600 BPI)
UNISERVO 30-36 tape drives (6250 BPI)(OEM from STK)

Display and print
Uniscope

Communication
UNIVAC BP - Buffer Processor; used as communications front-end to 418 and 490
UNIVAC CTMC - Communications Terminal Module Controller
UNIVAC GCS - General Communications System

Software

Operating systems and system software
 BOSS III or Business Oriented Systems Supervisor was the operating system for the UNIVAC III
 EXEC I
 EXEC II
 EXEC 8

Utilities, languages, and development aids

This is too small a list.

Applications
USAS

The Sperry Corporation years (1978 to 1986) 
UNIVAC 1100/2200 series:
UNIVAC 1100/60
UNIVAC 1100/70
UNIVAC 1100/80
UNIVAC 1100/90
UNIVAC Integrated Scientific Processor (ISP)

UNIVAC Series 90:
UNIVAC 90/25
UNIVAC 90/30
UNIVAC 90/40
UNIVAC 90/60
UNIVAC 90/70
UNIVAC 90/80

References

External links

A history of Univac computers and Operating Systems
UNIVAC CPU Timeline (1950-1980)

.
UNIVAC
UNIVAC products
.UNIVAC products
.UNIVAC products
UNIVAC products list